AAR or Aar may refer to:

Geography
Aar, a river in Switzerland, tributary of the Rhine
Aar (Lahn), a tributary of Lahn river in Germany, descending from the Taunus mountains
Aar (Dill), a tributary of  Dill river in Germany, also in the basin of the Lahn
Aar (Ill), a branch of the Ill river that separates from it in Strasbourg, France and rejoins it further north
Aar (Twiste), a tributary of  Twiste river in Germany, in the basin of the Weser
Aar (village), a village in Rajasthan, India
South American–Antarctic Ridge, also known as the American–Antarctic Ridge, a mid-ocean ridge in the South Atlantic
Antarctica, IAAF code AAR

Military
 After-action review, a structured review process used by the U.S. military
 After action report, a retrospective analysis
 Air-to-air refueling, the process of transferring aviation fuel from one military aircraft to another during flight
 Assistant Automatic Rifleman, a soldier who carries ammunition, see Rifleman#Modern_tactics.

Organizations
All American Racers, a former Formula 1 and CART team
Allens (law firm), a law firm (formerly known as Allens Arthur Robinson)
American Academy in Rome, research and arts institution in Rome
American Academy of Religion, an association of academics who research or teach topics related to religion
Association for Automated Reasoning, a non-profit that seeks to advance the field of automated reasoning
Association of American Railroads, an industry trade group representing the railroads of North America

Transportation
AAR Corporation, an American aviation engineering company
AAR coupling, railway coupling specification of the Association of American Railroads
AAR wheel arrangement, Association of American Railroads system for describing wheel arrangement of locomotives
All-American Road, a designation for some national scenic byways in the United States
Ann Arbor Railroad (disambiguation)
IATA airport code for Aarhus Airport in Tirstrup, Denmark
ICAO airline code for Asiana Airlines of South Korea

Other uses
Aar (Star Wars), fictional planet in Star Wars universe
Aar, a fictional planet of the star Deneb, in the "Captain Future" stories
The All-American Rejects, an American rock band
Air America Radio, a domestic United States radio network
Average accounting return, a capital budgeting investment rule
Adam's apple reduction, a surgery
Afar language (ISO 639 language identification code)
African American Review, a journal
Amino acid response, the biochemical response of  a mammalian cell starved of amino acids
"At any rate", see List of SMS abbreviations
Alkali–aggregate reaction, a chemical reaction leading to expansion in concrete

See also
Ahr, a river in Germany, tributary of the Rhine
Aare (disambiguation)